Christer Michael Fant (born 10 March 1953 in Sigtuna, Sweden) is a Swedish actor. He is a son of actor George Fant. He played the valet Melker in the 2011 "Sveriges Radios julkalender" Allt du önskar. In the 80s he hosted the TV program Guldslipsen.

Selected filmography
1991 - Sunes jul (TV)
1997 - Peter-No-Tail (TV series)
1998 - Pistvakt – En vintersaga (TV)
2000 - Gossip
2000 - Livet är en schlager
2000 - Pelle Svanslös och den stora skattjakten
2000 - Före stormen
2001 - Pusselbitar (TV)
2001 - Sprängaren
2001 - Villospår
2001 - Eva & Adam – fyra födelsedagar och ett fiasko
2003 - The Man Who Smiled
2003 - Ramona (TV)
2004 - Om Stig Petrés hemlighet (TV)
2005 - One Step Behind
2006 - LasseMajas detektivbyrå (TV series)
2007 - Labyrint (TV)
2010 - Våra vänners liv (TV)

References

External links

Swedish male actors
Living people
1953 births
People from Sigtuna Municipality